Independence National Forest in Nevada was established as the Independence Forest Reserve by the U.S. Forest Service on 5 November 1906 with .  It became a National Forest on 4 March 1907. On 1 July 1908 the entire forest was combined with Humboldt National Forest and the name was discontinued.

References

External links
Forest History Society
Listing of the National Forests of the United States and Their Dates (from Forest History Society website) Text from Davis, Richard C., ed. Encyclopedia of American Forest and Conservation History. New York: Macmillan Publishing Company for the Forest History Society, 1983. Vol. II, pp. 743-788.

Former National Forests of Nevada